International Village was a small theme park, shopping, dining and entertainment center located on the south side of Gettysburg, Pennsylvania.

History
Conceived and built by Richard L. Michael of Timeless Towns of the Americas, it was in operation from about 1970 until 1980. It was located across the parking lot of the Sheraton Resort Hotel (now the Eisenhower Resort and Convention Center) with a sky ride and hippo-themed tractor transporting guests between the hotel and village.

Rides
The carnival-like rides included a Chance turbo ride and carousel. A classic 1920 wooden carousel originally from Olcott Beach , Olcott, New York, was moved from Boulder Park, Indian Falls, New York, to the park in 1970.

Shops
The internationally themed shops included Das Gift Haus, Casa Del Oro, The Chinese Chalet, The Old Peddler, Far East Photo World, and Ye Village Toy Vendor. Goods such as imported cigars, collectible plates, oil paintings and international dolls were available. Korean Cuisine boasted that they were the first oriental restaurant to come to Gettysburg.

Demise
A few years after the park opened, business began to slow and some of the rides were closed or sold. The shops remained opened a few years longer while struggling to compete with history buffs who were probably more interested in the battlefields than the bargains.

Redevelopment efforts
The Devenshire apartment complex currently resides on the original site. In 2010, it was proposed to turn the area (including the Eisenhower Convention Center) in to a casino. At least once, the proposal was rejected by the state, in April 2011.

References

Defunct shopping malls in the United States
Gettysburg, Pennsylvania
Defunct amusement parks in Pennsylvania